Samuel Matthew Curran (born 3 June 1998) is an English cricketer who plays for England in all formats. In domestic cricket, he represents Surrey, and has played in multiple Twenty20 leagues, including for Kings XI Punjab and Chennai Super Kings in the Indian Premier League. On 23 December 2022, he was the subject of the highest bid in the history of Indian Premier League, when he was bought for £1.85 million (Rs. 18.5 crore) by Punjab Kings.

Curran made his Test and One Day International debuts in 2018, and his Twenty20 International debut in 2019. He was part of the England team that won the 2022 T20 World Cup, taking the most wickets for England at the tournament and was named Player of the Tournament. He plays as a left-handed all-rounder, bowling medium fast. He holds the English record for best T20I figures, 5–10 against Afghanistan in 2022.

Early life and education
Sam Curran was born on 3 June 1998 in Northampton, England to former Zimbabwe international cricketer Kevin Curran and mother Sarah Curran, while his father played county cricket for Northamptonshire. He is the brother of Surrey and England cricketer Tom Curran, and Northamptonshire cricketer Ben Curran. He grew up in Zimbabwe and was educated at Springvale House, Marondera and St. George's College, Harare. He spent his early years on the family farm in Rusape before the family left the farm during a period of land reform in Zimbabwe. In 2012, he moved to England and was educated at Wellington College, Berkshire.

Domestic and T20 career
Curran represented Surrey at Under-15, Under-17, and Second XI level. During the 2014 season he represented Weybridge in the Surrey Championship Premier Division. He was described by Surrey director of cricket Alec Stewart as "the best 17-year-old cricketer that I have seen".

Curran made his senior debut in a Twenty20 match in the NatWest t20 Blast tournament against Kent at The Oval on 19 June 2015, aged 17 years and 16 days. He made his first-class debut in a County Championship fixture against Kent at The Oval on 13 July 2015. At the age of 17 years and 40 days he became Surrey's second youngest first-class cricketer in history after Tony Lock, who debuted exactly 69 years earlier at the age of 17 years and 8 days, also against Kent at The Oval. He returned figures of 5/101 in the first innings, and is believed to be the youngest-ever player to take five wickets in a County Championship match. He made his List A debut in a Royal London One-Day Cup match against Northamptonshire at The Oval on Thursday 27 July 2015.

He was signed by Auckland Aces for the 2017–18 Super Smash. In December 2018, he was bought by the Kings XI Punjab in the player auction for the 2019 Indian Premier League for 7.20 crore Rupees (US$1 million). In March 2019, he was named as one of eight players to watch by the International Cricket Council (ICC) ahead of the 2019 Indian Premier League tournament. In the 2019 Indian Premier League, he scored quickfire 20 runs as opener and took a hat-trick in his second match, against Delhi Capitals which helped Kings XI Punjab to win by 14 runs, earning him the player of the match award. He also scored a quick fifty of just 23 balls against Kolkata Knight Riders in the 2019 Indian Premier League. He was released by the Kings XI Punjab ahead of the 2020 IPL auction. In the 2020 IPL auction, he was bought by the Chennai Super Kings ahead of the 2020 Indian Premier League.

In April 2022, he was bought by the Oval Invincibles for the 2022 season of The Hundred. In June 2022, Curran took his first five-wicket haul in Twenty20 cricket, with 5/30 against the Hampshire Hawks in the 2022 T20 Blast. Later the same month, in the County Championship match against Kent, Curran scored his maiden century in first-class cricket, with 126 runs. He reached his hundred off just 62 balls.

International career
Curran represented Zimbabwe Cricket U13s cricket team at the 2011–12 CSA U13 Week in South Africa, where he won the player of the tournament.

He represented England Under-19s at the 2016 ICC Under-19 Cricket World Cup, where he played all six games, scoring 201 runs and taking seven wickets to help his team finish sixth. He was selected for the England Lions for their 2016–17 tour of the United Arab Emirates, and again for their match against South Africa A at Canterbury in the 2017 season.

Curran received his first senior call-up for England in January 2018 for the 2017-18 Trans-Tasman Tri-Series against Australia and New Zealand, but did not play any games.

On 30 May 2018 he was added to the England Test squad ahead of the second Test against Pakistan, as cover for Ben Stokes. He made his Test debut at Headingley on 1 June 2018. Curran scored 20 in England's only innings, and returned match figures of 2/43.

On 24 June 2018, he made his One Day International debut against Australia.

Curran retained his place in the England squad for the Test series against India. In the first Test at Edgbaston he took 4/74 in the first innings, including the wickets of India's top three batsmen, and scored 63 in England's second innings, and was awarded Player of the Match. After being omitted from the England team for the third Test, he returned in place of the injured Chris Woakes at the Rose Bowl, where he top scored in England's first innings with 78. Curran registered his first Test duck in the fifth Test at The Oval, but was named England's Player of the Series against India, having contributed 272 runs and 11 wickets in England's 4–1 series victory. He was named Cricket Writers' Club Young Cricketer of the Year for his performances in the 2018 season.

Curran played two Tests during England's tour of Sri Lanka in November 2018, scoring 112 runs at an average of 37.33, but only took a single wicket. He played in the final Test of England's home series against Australia in September 2019, taking three wickets in Australia's first innings. Later that month he was named in England's Test and Twenty20 International (T20I) squads for their series against New Zealand. He made his T20I debut for England, against New Zealand, on 1 November 2019.

Curran played two Tests in the 2019 England tour of the West Indies, making 50 runs in four innings and taking one wicket at an average of 161. In the 2019 Test summer, Curran took 6 wickets at 16 and scored 87 runs at 21.8, in one Test against Ireland and the fifth Ashes Test.

After playing only two tests in the summer, Curran played all six Tests of the 2019–20 winter tours of New Zealand and South Africa. In the two New Zealand Tests, Curran took 6 wickets at an average of 39.7 and made 40 in three innings. In South Africa, Curran made 130 runs in 7 innings, and took 10 wickets at an average of 32.6, which included career best figures of 4/58 in the first Test.

On 29 May 2020, Curran was named in a 55-man group of players to begin training ahead of international fixtures starting in England following the COVID-19 pandemic. On 17 June 2020, Curran was included in England's 30-man squad to start training behind closed doors for the Test series against the West Indies. On 4 July 2020, Curran was named as one of the nine reserve players for the first Test match of the series.

In the 2020 England summer, Curran played in one Test against the West Indies and one against Pakistan, scoring 17 in his only innings and taking 4 wickets at an average of 36. Curran was included in the squad for England's 2021 tour of Sri Lanka.

Curran then played in all 5 T20I matches, and all 3 ODI matches as part of England's 2021 winter tour of India. On 28 March 2021, in the final ODI match of the tour, Curran was awarded Player of the Match for scoring 95* in England's attempted run chase of 329 set by India. England lost the match by 7 runs.

On 1 July 2021, in the second match against Sri Lanka, Curran took his first five-wicket haul in ODI cricket. On 16 August 2021 in the second test against India, Curran was the first batsman to get a king pair at Lord's.

In September 2021, Curran was named in England's squad for the 2021 ICC Men's T20 World Cup. However, on 5 October 2021, Curran was ruled out of England's squad due to a back injury, with his brother, Tom, named as his replacement.
Sam was out of action for around 7 months making his comeback in the County Championship for Surrey on 21 April 2022 against Somerset.

2022 T20 World Cup
In England's opening match against Afghanistan, Curran took a five-wicket haul (the first by an England player in T20Is), helping England win the match and earning him the Man of the Match award. In the Final against Pakistan he took 3/12 wickets in 4 overs and was again named Man of the Match. He was the second-highest wicket-taker in the tournament, taking 13 wickets with a bowling average of 11.38, and was named Player of the Tournament for his efforts.

References

External links

1995 births
Living people
English cricketers
England Test cricketers
England Twenty20 International cricketers
Cricketers from Northampton
Surrey cricketers
Alumni of St. George's College, Harare
People educated at Wellington College, Berkshire
English people of Zimbabwean descent
Auckland cricketers
North v South cricketers
Sam
Wisden Cricketers of the Year
Chennai Super Kings cricketers
Oval Invincibles cricketers
MI Cape Town cricketers